The Howqua River, a minor inland perennial river of the Goulburn Broken catchment, part of the Murray-Darling basin, is located in the Alpine region of the Australian state of Victoria. The headwaters of the Howqua River rise below Mount Howitt in the western slopes of the Victorian Alps, and descend to flow into the Goulburn River within Lake Eildon.

Location and features

The river rises below Mount Howitt on the western slopes of the Victorian Alps, within the Alpine National Park in the Shire of Mansfield. The river flow generally west, joined by five minor tributaries, before reaching its confluence with the Goulburn River within Lake Eildon, created by the Eildon Weir. The river descends  over its  course.

Cultural references
The Howqua valley was  seasonally occupied by the Taungurung people with the valley being a major route for trade or war between tribes in the area. The Howqua River valley contains a number of archaeological sites of significance including at least two quarry sites for greenstone, an exceptionally hard rock used for stone axes, spears and other cutting tools which the Taungurung traded with other tribes.

The character of Billy Slim in Nevil Shute's 1952 novel The Far Country was based on Fred Fry, a notable fly fisherman, who constructed several huts along the Howqua River and eked out a quiet existence in the river valley.

The Howqua River was one of just thirteen locations worldwide featured on the fly fishing documentary television series A River Somewhere.

Etymology
In the Aboriginal Woiwurrung and Taungurung languages, the river is named Pyerlite, with no clearly defined meaning.

There are four possible origins of the river's current name: firstly, after John "Howka" Hunter (1820–68), a pastoralist; secondly, a portmanteau name from Mount Howitt, where the river rises, and aqua; thirdly, after Howqua, a popular brand of Chinese tea in the early nineteenth century; and fourthly, after Akin Howqua (Ah Kin Wowqua), a Chinese surveyor and early resident of Melbourne.

See also

 
 Tunnel Bend diversion tunnel, Howqua River

References

Goulburn Broken catchment
Rivers of Hume (region)
Tributaries of the Murray River
Tributaries of the Goulburn River
Alpine National Park